Istustaya and Papaya are two goddesses of destiny with Hattian origin in  Hittite religion.

The task of Istustaya and Papaya is to spin the thread of life, especially the one of the king. They sit at the shores of the Black Sea. After Telipinu's return they take part on the conference of gods.

Literature 
 Volkert Haas: Die hethitische Literatur, Walter de Gruyter GmbH & Co. KG, Berlin 2006, pages 111, 322,

See also 
 Fates

Hittite deities
Hittite mythology
Hattian deities
Time and fate goddesses
Textiles in folklore